Malisahi is a village in Angul district, Odisha, India. It is situated in the side of long-standing river.  census its population was 1,570. A Shiva temple is situated in front of the long-standing river. Shivaratri is the biggest festival in this village.

References

Villages in Angul district